Gabicce Mare, also named Gabicce (Romagnol: Gabéc), is a town and comune (municipality) in the Province of Pesaro e Urbino, in Italy, region Marche.

The village has once been a fisherman's place, but nowadays it is  a summer tourist center with several beaches.

Twin towns
 Ötigheim, Germany, since 1999 
  Brussels, Belgium, since 2003 
  Eguisheim, France, since 2007

References

External links
Gabicce Mare Map
Gabicce Mare Map Legend
Parco naturale regionale del Monte San Bartolo Sito ufficiale

Cities and towns in the Marche